Chang Kai-chen and Han Xinyun were the defending champions, but chose not to partner each other. Chang partnered Duan Yingying, while Han partnered Zhang Kailin. The two teams faced in the quarterfinals with Chang and Duan prevailing.

Shuko Aoyama and Makoto Ninomiya won the title, defeating Chang and Duan in the final, 6–4, 6–4.

Seeds

Draw

References 
 Draw

ITF Women's Circuit - Wuhan - Doubles
Wuhan World Tennis Tour